KJTS is a Christian radio station licensed to New Ulm, Minnesota, broadcasting on 88.3 MHz FM.  The station is owned by Minn-Iowa Christian Broadcasting, Inc.

References

External links
KJTS's official website

New Ulm, Minnesota
Christian radio stations in Minnesota
Radio stations established in 2010
2010 establishments in Minnesota